Dobrzeń Mały (German: Klein Döbern) is a village in the administrative district of Gmina Dobrzeń Wielki, within Opole County, Opole Voivodeship, in south-western Poland.

The village has a population of 750.

History 
In the Upper Silesia plebiscite held on March 20, 1921, 321 eligible voters in Klein Döbern voted to remain with Germany and 188 voted for Poland. It therefore remained within the German Reich until 1945. In 1925, there were 818 inhabitants. Until 1945 it was part of the Oppeln district in the Prussian Province of Upper Silesia.

In 1945, it came under Polish administration and was renamed Dobrzeń Mały. On April 22, 2009, German was introduced as the second official language in Gmina Dobrzeń Wielki, to which Klein Döbern belongs, and on December 1, 2009, the place was also given the official German place name Klein Döbern .

References

Villages in Opole County